This article is a list of the tallest pyramids in the world, both ancient and modern.

Ancient pyramids

Modern pyramidal buildings

References

Pyramid
Pyramid
Pyramid